Bridge in Heidelberg Township is a historic stone arch bridge located in Germansville at Heidelberg Township, Lehigh County, Pennsylvania. It crosses a branch of Jordan Creek, and carries Memorial Road (QR 4028).

It was listed on the National Register of Historic Places in 1988.

References 

Road bridges on the National Register of Historic Places in Pennsylvania
Bridges completed in 1887
Bridges in Lehigh County, Pennsylvania
National Register of Historic Places in Lehigh County, Pennsylvania
Stone arch bridges in the United States